The Upper Blateštičko Lake is a small lake in the south of Kosovo. It is located 200m from the Lower Blateštičko Lake.

Notes

References

Sources
 
 

Šar Mountains
Lakes of Kosovo